Stephen Russell Leicht (born January 9, 1987) is an American professional stock car racing driver who competes part-time in the ARCA Menards Series and the ARCA Menards Series East, driving the No. 31 Toyota Camry for Rise Motorsports. He has previously competed in the NASCAR Cup Series (where he was the 2012 Rookie of the Year) NASCAR Xfinity Series and the NASCAR Truck Series. Leicht also has over 150 feature event wins in quarter midgets and go-kart racing.

Racing career

Early career
When he was seven years old, he began racing quarter midgets and began advancing into go-karts. At the age of 11, Leicht was participating in the Go Kart Nationals, when he collided with the flag stand and was sent flying from his racecar. He suffered a burst spleen as a result of the accident, and was kept out of racing for six months.

At the age of 12, he began racing stock cars and got his GED to focus full-time on racing, and was named Motorsports Magazines Rising Star of the Year in 2000. At the age of 15, he ran his first full year in the American Racing Association and was named Rookie of the Year.

NASCAR and ARCA career
In 2005, he moved to Wisconsin to work with veteran American Speed Association crew chief Howie Lettow. Leicht collected five wins en route to winning the national championship in the American Speed Association Late Model series for WalTom Racing. He won both races that he attempted in the American StockCar League. He finished first or second in thirteen of sixteen events that entered between the two series. He started eighth in his Busch series debut at Memphis Motorsports Park, and finished thirteenth. He ran another race at Phoenix, starting seventeenth and finishing nineteenth.

In 2006, Leicht ran ARCA Re/Max Series events for Yates Racing and WalTom Racing. He earned his first career ARCA series win in his second career start at Nashville Superspeedway in April. .  He also made four Busch series starts in 2006, posting two Top 10 qualifying efforts. On July 23, he made his first Nextel Cup Series start in the Pennsylvania 500 at Pocono Raceway for Yates Racing, qualifying 36th and finishing 33rd, one lap behind.

In 2007, Leicht ran the full NASCAR Busch Series schedule.  He won his first race at Kentucky Speedway and finished 7th in the final drivers' points ranking. At the end of the season, Robert Yates Racing released Leicht from his contract because of sponsorship and finance issues. 2008 saw Leicht land a part-time stint in Richard Childress' No. 21 Nationwide car, sharing driving duties with Bobby Labonte. Leicht ran four races with a best finish of seventh at Phoenix International Raceway. However, after Talladega, a lack of sponsorship sidelined Leicht until Texas in the fall, where he finished 18th.

In 2009, Leicht drove the No. 29 Chevrolet Impala in 13 races. Leicht was originally slated to run 23 events, but his races were nearly halved by the addition of Clint Bowyer as co-driver. He ran nine total races and had six top-ten finishes. He was released from RCR at the end of the year and signed to attempt 29 races for D'Hondt Humphrey Motorsports in the No. 91 car in 2010, but was released after two races.

Leicht competed in his first NASCAR race since 2009 (and his first Sprint Cup start since 2006) in Tommy Baldwin Racing's No. 36 Chevrolet in 2011, while regular driver Dave Blaney piloted the team's second car, the No. 35 Chevrolet. The move gave Leicht a guaranteed start while Blaney had to qualify on time. Blaney finished 19th while Leicht finished 24th despite running in the Top 10 most of the race.

Leicht drove for Joe Falk at Richmond in April 2012, qualifying 40th and finishing 35th, running at the end but finishing nine laps down. After skipping Talladega, he filed to compete for Rookie of the Year in the Sprint Cup Series, with plans to run the majority of the remainder of the season in the No. 33, except for the June race in Michigan, when Richard Childress Racing driver Austin Dillon drove the No. 33.

Leicht's best finish of 2012 was 26th at Watkins Glen, ending on the lead lap. He attempted 21 races and competed in 15, and won the series Rookie of the Year award for 2012. After a four-year absence in NASCAR, on January 10, 2017, Leicht received a ride to drive the No. 77 Chevrolet Camaro for Obaika Racing starting at Daytona. However, Leicht moved to Obaika's primary No. 97 car for Daytona, causing the No. 77 to withdraw. Leicht attempted the first six races in the 97 as a start and park operation. Leicht only qualified for four races, failing to qualify at Daytona and Texas. Leicht was left without a ride when the 97 scaled back its schedule after the sixth race. Leicht raced at Charlotte in the No. 93 for RSS Racing, start and parking the car. In July, Leicht made his return to the Cup Series at Pocono, driving the No. 83 for BK Racing.

On January 22, 2018, it was announced that Leicht is tabbed as a full-time driver for a newly formed team JP Motorsports. Leicht finished 15th after avoiding multiple crashes at Daytona. He was replaced by Jennifer Jo Cobb at Talladega since she brought sponsorship. On May 22, 2018, it was announced that Leicht and JP Motorsports parted ways and was replaced by Brandon Hightower. On July 28, Leicht returned to No. 93 for RSS Racing at Iowa Speedway start and parked it. The following week, Leicht drove the No. 74 for Mike Harmon Racing at Watkins Glen International, where he didn't qualify for the race.

In February 2019, it was announced that Leicht will drive the No. 01 full-time for JD Motorsports. After one season with JD, Leicht moved over to Carl Long's MBM Motorsports No. 61 car for 2020 having his best finish of 21st at the Pennzoil 150.

For 2021 he would attempt five races in the No. 61 MBM Motorsports Toyota and three races in the No.13. The first race for Leicht was the Super Start Batteries 188, he also was scheduled to drive in the Pit Boss 250 but failed to qualify. He was also scheduled to drive in the B&L Transport 170, but he was replaced by David Starr after Starr DNQed in the No. 13 also for MBM Motorsports.

After being without a ride in 2022, Leicht returned to racing in 2023 in ARCA, returning to the series for the first time since 2006, driving the No. 31 car for Rise Motorsports.

Personal life
After finding himself out of a ride after winning Cup Series Rookie of the year in 2012, Leicht worked for a time at a car dealership in Cornelius, North Carolina for a short period of time. During downswings in his racing career, Leicht suffered from clinical depression and eventually went to counseling to treat it.

Motorsports career results

NASCAR
(key) (Bold – Pole position awarded by qualifying time. Italics – Pole position earned by points standings or practice time. * – Most laps led.)

Monster Energy Cup Series

Xfinity Series

Camping World Truck Series

ARCA Menards Series
(key) (Bold – Pole position awarded by qualifying time. Italics – Pole position earned by points standings or practice time. * – Most laps led.)

ARCA Menards Series East

 Season still in progress 
 Ineligible for series points 
 Leicht began the 2017 season racing for Cup Series points but switched to Xfinity Series points before the race at Homestead-Miami Speedway

References

External links

 
 

Living people
1987 births
Sportspeople from Asheville, North Carolina
Racing drivers from North Carolina
NASCAR drivers
ARCA Menards Series drivers
American Speed Association drivers
Robert Yates Racing drivers
Richard Childress Racing drivers